National Highway 266, commonly referred to as NH 266 is a national highway in  India. It is a spur road of National Highway 61. NH-266 traverses the state of Maharashtra in India. This highway is being rehabilitated and upgraded to 2 lanes with paved shoulders.

Route 

Jat - Kavathe Mahankal - Tasgaon - Palus - Karad.

Junctions  

  Terminal near Jat.
  near Borgaon - Shirdhon.
  near Tasgaon.
  Terminal near Karad
  Terminal near Karad.

See also 

 List of National Highways in India
 List of National Highways in India by state

References

External links 

 NH 266 on OpenStreetMap

National highways in India
National Highways in Maharashtra